Hajdúböszörmény is a district in northern part of Hajdú-Bihar County. Hajdúböszörmény is also the name of the town where the district seat is found. The district is located in the Northern Great Plain Statistical Region. This district is a part of Hajdúság historical and geographical region.

Geography 
Hajdúböszörmény District borders with Tiszavasvári District and Nyíregyháza District (Szabolcs-Szatmár-Bereg County) to the north, Hajdúhadház District to the east, Debrecen District to the south, Balmazújváros District and Hajdúnánás District to the west. The number of the inhabited places in Hajdúböszörmény District is 2.

Municipalities 
The district has 2 towns.
(ordered by population, as of 1 January 2012)

The bolded municipalities are cities.

Demographics

In 2011, it had a population of 40,568 and the population density was 86/km².

Ethnicity
Besides the Hungarian majority, the main minorities are the Roma (approx. 1,000) and German (100).

Total population (2011 census): 40,568
Ethnic groups (2011 census): Identified themselves: 36,078 persons:
Hungarians: 34,741 (96.29%)
Gypsies: 973 (2.70%)
Others and indefinable: 364 (1.01%)
Approx. 4,500 persons in Hajdúböszörmény District did not declare their ethnic group at the 2011 census.

Religion
Religious adherence in the county according to 2011 census:

Reformed – 8,822;
Catholic – 8,779 (Greek Catholic – 7,087; Roman Catholic – 1,692);
other religions – 846; 
Non-religious – 11,548; 
Atheism – 445;
Undeclared – 10,128.

Gallery

See also
List of cities and towns of Hungary

References

External links
 Postal codes of the Hajdúböszörmény District

Districts in Hajdú-Bihar County